Kindling is the debut solo album by Country rock musician Gene Parsons recorded in 1973. Guest musicians on this album include former Byrds bandmate Clarence White, plus Vassar Clements, Ralph Stanley, Bill Payne, and Gib Guilbeau.

Track listing
"Monument"  (Gene Parsons) – 2:06
"Long Way Back"  (Gene Parsons) – 2:29
"Do Not Disturb"  (Skip Battin, Kim Fowley) – 1:55
"Willin'"  (Lowell George) – 3:18
"On the Spot"  (Gene Parsons, Clarence White, Gib Guilbeau) – 1:38
"Take a City Bride"  (Gib Guilbeau) – 2:17
"Sonic Bummer"  (Gene Parsons) – 2:18
"I Must Be a Tree"  (Gene Parsons, Gib Guilbeau) – 3:17
"Drunkard's Dream"  (Ralph Stanley) – 2:37
"Banjo Dog"  (Gene Parsons) – 2:10
"Back Again"  (Gene Parsons) – 2:57

Personnel
Gene Parsons - guitar, bass, banjo, drums, harmonica, auto harp, percussion, vocals
Clarence White - guitar, mandolin
Vassar Clements - violin
Gib Guilbeau - rhythm guitar, fiddle
Roger Bush (musician) - bass
Bill Payne - keyboards
Nick DeCaro - accordion
Ralph Stanley - tenor vocal
Red Callender - tuba
Andy Newmark - drums

Production
Producer: Russ Titelman
Recording Engineer: Lee Herschberg, Donn Landee, Bobby Hata
Art Direction: John and Barbara Cascado
Photography: Greg Gorman

References

External links
 The Kindling Collection

Gene Parsons albums
1973 albums
Albums produced by Russ Titelman
Warner Records albums